Eric D. Spoto (born October 22, 1976) is an American arm-wrestler and powerlifter, who specializes in the bench press. He previously held world record in the raw (unequipped) bench press with 722 lb (327.5 kg) achieved on May 19, 2013.

Early life
Eric Spoto was born and raised in Long Island, New York. He was interested in strength sports and powerlifting from early on. In the 90s he moved to Las Vegas with his family. While having never competed in a powerlifting meet he started competing in armwrestling occasionally and had unofficial practice match victories against arm wrestling champions including Allen Fisher, Michael Todd, Dave Randall and Travis Bagent.

Powerlifting career
To achieve this, he paused his arm-wrestling career.

Spoto also won the "500 Pound Strict-Bench-For-Reps Challenge" of the competition by pressing the 500 lb raw easily for ten repetitions with plenty more in the tank, outclassing the runner-up Al Davis by 3 reps.

In his second competition on November 3, 2012 at the 2012 SPF Mens Fall Open, titled "Backyard Meet of The Century", competing on the raw bench-only flight, Eric Spoto was expected to break the 715.0 lb raw record, but failed three times at attempting .

At the 2013 Southern Powerlifting Federation (SPF) California State Powerlifting Meet in Sacramento, California on May 19, 2013 Spoto competed again and finally broke the record. Eric successfully bench pressed  on his first, 716 lb on his second and 722 pounds (327.5 kg) on his third attempt wearing only a singlet, belt and wrist wraps. By pressing 722 lb raw Eric Spoto achieved the highest bench press ever performed without the aid of a bench shirt, surpassing the previous mark of 715 lb, set by Scot Mendelson 8 years before in 2005. Eric Spoto is currently the #3 ranked raw bench presser in the world, his record having been broken by Kirill Sarychev in 2015, and the latter's record by Julius Maddox on 19 March 2020 with a 770 pounds 350 kg press at the Arnold Sports Classic in Columbus.

Personal records
Powerlifting competition records:

done in official powerlifting meets
 Raw Bench press – 722.0 lb (327.5 kg) @ 315.5 lb (SHW) raw with only wrist wraps and belt (May 19, 2013 SPF)

Powerlifting gym records (unofficial):

done in the gym (based on video footage)
 Raw Bench press –  for 45 reps
 Raw Bench press –  for 26 reps
 Raw Bench press –  for 17 reps
 Raw Bench press –  for 8 reps
 Raw Bench press –  for 4 reps
 Raw Bench press –  for 3 reps
 Raw Bench press –  for 2 reps 3 board press
 Bench press –  for 2 reps  with slingshot
 Bench press –  for 1 rep with slingshot
 Raw Bench Press Video Compilation http://ericspoto.com/videos/

Personal life
Born on October 22, 1976,  Eric Spoto grew up in Nesconset, New York. He was the second of three children born to Danny and Pauline Spoto. He has two sisters – Stephanie and Gary. Today, he lives in Henderson, Nevada in the Las Vegas Valley.

See also
 Progression of the bench press world record
 Scot Mendelson
 Big James Henderson
 Jim Williams
 Ted Arcidi
 Siamand Rahman

References

Living people
American powerlifters
American people of Italian descent
1976 births
People from Nesconset, New York
People from Henderson, Nevada